The Standard (German: Die Standarte) is a 1977 war drama film directed by Ottokar Runze and starring Simon Ward, Siegfried Rauch and Peter Cushing. It was made as a co-production between Austria, Spain and West Germany. The film is based on the 1934 novel The Standard by Alexander Lernet-Holenia, previously turned into a 1935 film My Life for Maria Isabella in Nazi Germany. It premiered at the Cannes Film Festival.

The film's sets were designed by the art director Peter Scharff. Location shooting took place in Vienna and Toledo province in Spain.

Another English-language title of this film is Battle Flag.

Cast

References

Bibliography 
 Bock, Hans-Michael & Bergfelder, Tim. The Concise CineGraph. Encyclopedia of German Cinema. Berghahn Books, 2009.
 Goble, Alan. The Complete Index to Literary Sources in Film. Walter de Gruyter, 1999.

External links 
 

1977 films
1970s war drama films
German war drama films
West German films
Austrian war drama films
Spanish war drama films
1970s historical drama films
German historical drama films
Spanish historical drama films
Austrian historical drama films
1970s English-language films
English-language Austrian films
English-language German films
English-language Spanish films
1970s German-language films
Films directed by Ottokar Runze
Films shot in Spain
Films based on Austrian novels
German World War I films
Films set in Belgrade
Films set in Vienna
Films set in 1918
Remakes of German films
1970s German films